His Strongest Weapon is a 1928 German silent thriller film directed by Harry Piel and starring Piel, Vera Schmiterlöw and Philipp Manning.

The film's sets were designed by the art director Willi Herrmann.

Cast

References

Bibliography

External links

1928 films
1920s action thriller films
German action thriller films
Films of the Weimar Republic
German silent feature films
Films directed by Harry Piel
UFA GmbH films
Silent thriller films
1920s German films